Zandtbach is a river of Bavaria, Germany. It flows into the Franconian Rezat east of Lichtenau.

See also
List of rivers of Bavaria

References

Rivers of Bavaria
Tributaries of the Franconian Rezat
Rivers of Germany